The 1985 USFL Territorial Draft was the third Territorial Draft of the United States Football League (USFL). It took place on January 3, 1985, at the Grand Hyatt Hotel in New York. Under the previous two territorial drafts, each team had five designated schools from which to make 25 selections. In this season it was raised to six schools per team, which was speculated in the media as a way to allow the New Jersey Generals to sign quarterback Doug Flutie.

Player selections

References

External links
 1985 USFL Territorial Draft Pick Transactions
 1985 USFL Draft

United States Football League drafts
USFL Territorial Draft
USFL Territorial Draft
1980s in Manhattan
American football in New York City
Sports in Manhattan
Sporting events in New York City
USFL Territorial Draft